Spanish Affair is a 1957 American–Spanish co-produced drama film directed by Don Siegel and Luis Marquina. It features Carmen Sevilla, Richard Kiley and José Guardiola. It was shot at the CEA Studios in Madrid. The film's sets were designed by the art directors Tambi Larsen and Hal Pereira.

Plot
Merritt Blake, a young American architect, comes to Spain to close a series of commercial agreements. When he learns that he will need to convince three Spanish architects of the design which he has proposed, he insists on inviting Mari (Antonio's assistant) to function as interpreter.

They set off, first to visit the Conde de Rivera, who tells Merritt that he will support the project if his colleague in Barcelona favors the plan. Mari cautions Merritt that this is not a "done deal."

On the way to Barcelona, Mari notices that her former boyfriend is following her. She fears that he will assume she is involved inappropriately with the architect. She tries to return to Madrid, but the architect insists she continue the journey with him.

Cast
Richard Kiley as Merritt Blake
Carmen Sevilla as Mari Zarubia
 Jose Guardiola as Antonio
Jesús Tordesillas as Sotelo
José Manuel Martín as Fernando
Francisco Bernal as waiter
Purita Vargas as Purita
Antonio S. Amaya as Miguel
Rafael Farina as flamenco singer

Curiosities
The film was made on location in Madrid using the same cameras and auxiliary camera equipment as Funny Face; Paramount has shipped the equipment from Los Angeles to Paris, then held it over in Europe for this production after the Fred Astaire/Audrey Hepburn project had wrapped.
One of the cars which appears in the film is a Pegaso Z-102 Spyder.

See also
 List of American films of 1957

References

External links

http://www.filmaffinity.com/es/film182752.html

Spanish drama films
1957 drama films
1957 films
Films directed by Don Siegel
American drama films
Films set in Spain
Films scored by Daniele Amfitheatrof
Paramount Pictures films
1950s English-language films
1950s American films